Erythroid membrane-associated protein is a protein that in humans is responsible for the Scianna blood group system, and is encoded by the ERMAP gene.

References

Further reading

External links
 Scianna blood group system in the BGMUT blood group antigen gene mutation database

Blood antigen systems